The Gavitt Tipoff Games was an annual eight-game NCAA Division I men's college basketball series played between the Big Ten Conference and the Big East Conference early in the season. The games began in 2015 and were played annually until 2022 except in 2020, when they were cancelled because of the COVID-19 pandemic.

The Gavitt Tipoff Games were played on the home courts of participating schools, with four hosted by Big Ten schools and four hosted by Big East schools each year. Originally, plans called for an eight-year deal, with each Big East team participating a minimum of six times and each Big Ten program taking part a minimum of four times. However, the cancellation of the 2020 games reduced the competition from eight to seven seasons, and the games cancelled that year prevented some teams from playing the minimum number originally envisioned: From the Big Ten, Maryland and Michigan State played only three games, while five Big East teams played only five. Connecticut, which did not move from the American Athletic Conference to the Big East until the 2020-2021 season, never played in the Gavitt Tipoff Games.

Each game played at a Big East campus was televised by Fox Sports 1 and each game played on a Big Ten campus was televised by Fox Sports 1 or the Big Ten Network.

The series was named in honor of the late Dave Gavitt (1937–2011), former athletic director at Providence College who served from 1979 to 1990 as the first commissioner of the original Big East Conference of 1979–2013.

Conference records

Big East Conference (1–3–3)

Big Ten Conference (3–1–3)

Results

2015 Tied 4–4

2016 Tied 4–4

2017 Tied 4–4

2018 Big Ten 5–3

2019 Big Ten 5–3

2020 — Cancelled 

Plans announced in May 2020 called for Butler, Creighton, Georgetown, Marquette, Providence, St. John's, Villanova, and Xavier to represent the Big East and Illinois, Indiana, Iowa, Maryland, Michigan State, Purdue, Rutgers, and Wisconsin the Big Ten in the 2020 Gavitt Tipoff Games, which were scheduled for November 16–20, 2020. After the NCAA delayed the start of the 2020–21 season from November 10 to November 25 due to the COVID-19 pandemic, however, the Big East and Big Ten jointly announced on October 28, 2020, that the 2020 Gavitt Tipoff Games were cancelled and the series would be on hiatus for a year. In their statement, the two conferences also announced their intention to resume the games during the 2021–22 season.

2021 Big East 6–2

2022 Big Ten 62

References

Big East Conference men's basketball
Big Ten Conference men's basketball
College men's basketball competitions in the United States
College basketball competitions
Recurring sporting events established in 2015
2015 establishments in the United States